The 2011 Virginia National Bank Men's Pro Championship was a professional tennis tournament played on hard courts. It was the third edition of the tournament which is part of the 2011 ATP Challenger Tour. It took place in Charlottesville, United States between 31 October and 6 November 2011.

ATP entrants

Seeds

 1 Rankings are as of October 24, 2011.

Other entrants
The following players received wildcards into the singles main draw:
  Denis Kudla
  Michael Shabaz
  Sanam Singh
  Jack Sock

The following players received entry from the qualifying draw:
  Carsten Ball
  Jarmere Jenkins
  Steve Johnson
  Jesse Levine

The following players received entry as a lucky loser into the singles main draw:
  Alex Bogdanovic

Champions

Singles

 Izak van der Merwe def.  Jesse Levine, 4–6, 6–3, 6–4

Doubles

 Treat Conrad Huey /  Dominic Inglot def.  John Paul Fruttero /  Raven Klaasen, 4–6, 6–3, [10–7]

External links
Official Website
ITF Search
ATP official site

Virginia National Bank Men's Pro Championship
Charlottesville Men's Pro Challenger